Rajadhiraja I (994 CE - 1052 CE)  was a Chola emperor, the most skilled military commander among the Chola rulers and the successor of his father, Rajendra I. He was the only Chola emperor who was killed while leading his army in war, and although he had a short reign, he helped his father conquer several territories as well as to maintain the Chola authority over most of Sri Lanka, Eastern Chalukya and Kalinga, among others. He also established imperial relations with overseas allies despite a series of revolts in the territory.

Rajadhiraja Chola proved capable of maintaining the vast and expansive empire with territories even outside the shores of India. Records also show that the king was a skilled commander on the battlefield, leading his soldiers from the front lines. He earned the title Jayamkonda Solan (The Victorious Cholan) after numerous victories. Towards the end of his reign, he sacked the Western Chalukyan capital Kalyanapuram and assumed the title Kalyanapuramkonda Chola and performed a Virabhisheka (anointment of heroes) under the name Vijaya Rajendra Cholan (the victorious Rajendra Cholan).

Long Apprenticeship 

Rajadhiraja Chola was made co-regent very early in his reign (1018).  From that day onward, father and son ruled together and shared the burdens of the empire. From the inscriptions of Rajadhiraja it is evident that Rajadhiraja ruled in full regal status in the lifetime of his father. Rajadhiraja was at the forefront of most of his father's military campaigns.

Military Campaigns

Revolts in Lanka

The Buddhist text Mahavamsa shows that the years following the defeat and deportation of the Sinhalese king Mahinda V by Rajendra in 1017 CE were filled with revolt and anarchy due uprisings by the Sinhalese subjects against the reign of the Chola invaders. Mahinda was captured and transported to the Chola country as prisoner where he died 12 years later. Mahinda's son Kassapa had formed the resistance against the Chola occupiers and the revolts were centered on Kassapa.

Kassapa managed to face off the almost 95,000 strong Chola army for over six months and push them northwards from the Rohana area in southern Sri Lanka he then crowned himself Vikramabahu in 1029 C.E. Cholas never intended to subjugate the entire island of Sri Lanka and only occupied the whole island for a period of about 10 years. Sinhalese resistance was assisted by various Pandyan princes against their common enemy. Pandyas had a very close political as well as marital relationship with the Sinhalese.

During Rajadhiraja's reign this became very acute as Vikramabahu launched an all out attack on the Tamil armies to expel them from the island. He was assisted by a Pandya prince Vikarama Pandya and Jagatpala, a prince from the distant Kanauj in North India. Rajadhiraja's forces battled and killed these princes.

The version of the Mahavamsa has to be taken in the right perspective in that it states itself to be a Buddhist chronicle and its point of view is only supposed to favour Buddhist subjects. We cannot expect it to speak in very complimentary terms about non-Buddhist kings. In any case, at least in war, the Cholas were known to be very uncompromising with their enemies and believed in eliminating them rather than setting them free. whether it was the "Chalukyas", "Pandyas" or the "Ilangai kings"... their treatment was the same, which the Mahavamsa chroniclers found inhuman. What is valorous and uncompromising warfare on the part of the Cholas was described as brutal conduct when it came to describing defeats of the rulers of Eelam (Sri Lanka).

The Chola provinces in Lanka were a separate administrative division of the empire. The deep southern half was however a Sinhalese stronghold in perpetual conflict with the Cholas. Prince Kitti, son of Vikramabahu became Vijayabahu in 1058 CE and took over the leadership of the resistance. The generals of Cholas executed the captured Lankan generals along with their family members.

Continuing Chalukya Wars

Rajadhiraja, eager to subdue the rising power of the Western Chalukyas and to restore Chola influence with the Eastern Chalukyas in Vengi, personally led an expedition into the Telugu country in 1046 CE. He defeated the Western Chalukya forces in a battle at Dannada on the river Krishna and set fire to their fort. This expedition was followed by number of raids into the Chalukya country by the Chola army in which they captured several generals and feudatories of Chalukya, demolished the Chalukya palace at Kampali. The victorious Chola forces crossed the Krishna river and erected a victory pillar at a place called Yetagiri. After more fighting, Kalyani, the capital of Chalukya, which is identified as Kalyan or Basavakalyan in Bidar was sacked. Cholas also placed a victory pillar in Kolhapur or Kollapuram in Maharashtra.The victorious Rajadhiraja entered the capital of the vanquished Chalukyas and his coronation was performed at 'Kalyanapura', subsequent to which he assumed the title Vijayarajendra. Someshvara I was banished to places like Rodda, Kadambalige and Kogali 1000 territories in the Nolambavadi areas[**].

In 1050 CE Chalukya king Someshvara reneged on his payment of tribute to his Chola overlords and usurped the Chalukya throne from the Chola viceroy in Kalyani (modern Basavakalyan). He also sent an expedition to Vengi in order to re-inforce Western Chalukyan hegemony over the Eastern Chalukyas, whom they always regarded as their dominions. It is also speculated that Someshvara I 'may' have captured Kanchi and Kalinga. However, according to Nilakanta Sastri and Majumdar, these are baseless claims because Someshvara I had as his feudatories the Uchangi Pandyas and the Nolamba Pallavas who had provided shelter to his predecessors Jayasimha-II and Satyashraya. The Nolamba Pallavas pompously held the birudas 'Lord of Kanchi', which may lead one to believe that the feudatories of the Chalukyas were ruling from Kanchi or occupying Kanchipuram, both of which presumptions are false. Also, the Cholas were controlling Kalinga through the Vengi Kings like Vimaladitya and Raja Raja Narendra who were related to the Chola Kings. While Someshvara-I did destabilise Vengi by temporarily displacing Rajaraja Narendra, this act also initially disturbed Chola connections with Kalinga. This however, was short-lived for immediately Rajadhiraja-I set off for war against Someshvara-I and that too not at Vengi or Kalinga but by the Chalukya capital itself. But that was after thoroughly preparing himself for war before which he undertook in 1052, the task of anointing his younger brother Rajendra Chola II as co-regent in preference to his own sons. The latter seems to have ascended the throne in 12th for he has the title Rajakesari from then on. When these tasks were completed, in 1054 Rajadhiraja invaded the Chalukyan territory[**].

Rajadhiraja invaded Rattamandalam (southern Karnataka) and immediately seized many of the southern parts of Chalukyan territory like Uchangi, Nulambavadi, Kadambalige, Kogali etc. These developments shook Someshvara-I, who had given himself the title of Trailokyamalla after installing his puppet in Vengi and he had to rush back to save his own kingdom and he had no option but to march against the marauding Chola armies. The two armies met at a place called Koppam on the banks of the Krishna River[**].

Inscriptions 

Rajadhiraja's inscriptions begin with the introduction tingaler-taru. The following is an inscription from the Svetaranyesvara temple in Tiruvenkadu, a few miles from Vaitheeswaran temple. It mentions the king's father, i.e., emperor Rajendra I

There is another inscription of the king his 29th regnal year from the Manimangalam village about donation of land which speaks on a detailed way his military achievements. Inscription goes on to describe the following:

a. Appointment of his 7 relatives as governors to Chera, Chalukya, Pandya, Ganga, Ceylon, Pallava and Kanyakubja (Kannauj – UP).

b. Victorious war against ahavamalla, vikki, vijayaditya who are Someswarar I, Vikramaditya VI and Vijayaditya respectively of Western Chalukya and the burning of Kollipakai.

c. His exploits at Ceylon where he attacked its four kings (Vikramabahu, Veera Salamegan, Vikrama Pandya and Srivallabha madanaraja) . Out of four, vira salamegan had initially ruled over Kannauj. Rajadhiraja while sacking Ceylon had seized his elder sister and his wife and also went on to cut the nose of his mother.

d. On his second raid to chalukyan kingdom, he went on to burn Kampili and he died on the battle field at Kopam. There is one inscription by Western Chalukya which was inscribed in Annigere which talks of a wicked chozha who had abandoned his religious practices and burned Jaina temples and ultimately yielded his head to someswara.

Another inscription of the king from a temple in Chengalpattu district is as follows,

Here is the inscription from Kolar in Karnataka:

Sometime after he ascended the throne, he placed Rajendra Chola II as a co-regent. Rajendra Chola II would reign alongside Rajadhiraja until the latter's death after which he ascended the throne.

Death on the Battlefield
He was one of the greatest and bravest warriors in the Chola dynasty and sadly perished alone in a northern battlefield (Battle of Koppam). From the manner of his death, Rajadhiraja came to be known as Yanai-mel-thunjina Devar (the king who died on the back of an elephant). From the time he was chosen heir-apparent by his father to the day when he laid down his life on the field of battle, Rajadhiraja led the life of a warrior king and led many campaigns in person. Rajadhiraja was first and foremost a soldier and possibly his great military talent formed the reason for his being preferred for succession against an elder brother of his.

Personal life

Rajadhiraja employed his father's brother, his own brothers, elder and younger, in important offices of state and constituted them into subordinate rulers of regions of his empire. We know of the title (Trilokyam Udaiyar) rather than the actual name of a queen. His queens do not figure prominently in his records. Apart from Vijaya Rajendra, he took the titles of Virarajendra Varman, Ahavamally Kulantaka and Kalyanapurangondachola. His children seem to have been overlooked in the succession to the Chola throne for a brief time.

Officials

Vira-Vichchadira(Vidyadhara)-Muvendavelan was a prominent military officer of this king. He has made several generous donations to the various temples in Kalavara nadu, a sub-division of Nigarili-Chola-mandalam (part of present-day Karnataka) where he was deployed. Vettan Panachanadi-Vānan alias Madurāntaka-tTamil-pperaiyan of Tandāngurai in Vilānādu belonging to the Pandikulasani valanadu of Sola-mandalam was the overseer of the dandanayakas. Santi Kuttan Tiruvalan Tirumud Kunran alias Vijaya Rajendra Acharyan, an actor was in charge of the troupe that were responsible for enacting the Rajarajeswara Natakam (a musical), in the Brihadeeswarar Temple, Thanjavur. Velala Madurantakam alias Dandanayakan Rajadhiraja Ilangovelan was another officer from Nadar, a village of Tiraimur-nadu which was a sub-division of Uyyakondan-valanadu in Sola-mandalam. He has donated 90 sheep to a temple in Tiruvorriyur during the 3rd year of the reign of Rajendra Chola II when the latter was still a co-regent of the king.

Religion 
Like his forefathers, he too was a devout of Shaivisim. The Shaiva Siddhanta school of thought was prevalent and the Bhakti poetry of the Nayanars were encouraged and sang in the temples. We have a record dated in the twenty eighth year of the king's reign from the Adhipurisvara temple in Tiruvorriyur which mentions the Tiruttondatogai of Sundarar and the names of the sixty three Nayanars.

Notes

References 
 

 Nilakanta Sastri, K.A. (1935). The CōĻas, University of Madras, Madras (Reprinted 1984).
 Nilakanta Sastri, K.A. (1955). A History of South India, OUP, New Delhi (Reprinted 2002).
 
 South Indian shrines: illustrated By P. V. Jagadisa Ayyar
 The Chālukyas of Kalyāṇa and the Kalachuris By Balakrishnan Raja Gopal

Chola kings
1052 deaths
11th-century Indian monarchs
Hindu monarchs
Indian military leaders